:lt:Antanas Belazaras

Antanas Belazaras (December 22, 1913 in Upyte, now Panevėžys district – November 15, 1976 in Panevėžys) was a Lithuanian composer.

Selected works
Dainos ir Romansai ( Songs and Romances) 1998

Recordings
 Литовские Песни, Aleksandra Staškevičiūtė

References
 

1913 births
1976 deaths